The Medal of Honor Monument, also known as the Oregon Medal of Honor Roll, is a granite obelisk commemorating Oregon's Medal of Honor recipients, installed outside the Oregon Department of Veterans' Affairs Building in Salem, Oregon, United States. Cut from a step leading to the Oregon State Capitol, the memorial is a replica of the state's monument in the Medal of Honor Grove Freedom Foundation at Valley Forge, Pennsylvania.

References

Granite sculptures in Oregon
Medal of Honor
Monuments and memorials in Salem, Oregon
Outdoor sculptures in Salem, Oregon
Obelisks in the United States